Gall wasps, also incorrectly called gallflies, are hymenopterans of the family Cynipidae in the wasp superfamily Cynipoidea. Their common name comes from the galls they induce on plants for larval development. About 1,300 species of this generally very small creature (1–8 mm) are known worldwide, with about 360 species of 36 different genera in Europe and some 800 species in North America.

Features 
Like all Apocrita, gall wasps have a distinctive body shape, the so-called wasp waist. The first abdominal tergum (the propodeum) is conjoined with the thorax, while the second abdominal segment forms a sort of shaft, the petiole. The petiole connects with the gaster, which is the functional abdomen in apocritan wasps, starting with the third abdominal segment proper. Together, the petiole and the gaster form the metasoma, while the thorax and the propodeum make up the mesosoma.

The antennae are straight and consist of two or three segments. In many varieties, the backside of the mesosoma appears longitudinally banded. The wings are typically simply structured. The female's egg-depositing ovipositor is often seen protruding from the tip of the metasoma.

Reproduction and development 
The reproduction of gall wasps is usually partly parthenogenesis, in which a male is completely unnecessary, and partly two-sex propagation. Most species have alternating generations, with one two-sex generation and one parthenogenic generation annually, whereas some species produce very few males and reproduce only by parthenogenesis, possibly because of infection of the females' gametes by endosymbiotic  Wolbachia bacteria. The various generations differentiate both in their appearance and in the form of the plant galls they induce.

The larvae of most gall wasps develop in characteristic plant galls they induce themselves, but many species are instead inquilines of other gall wasps, such as those of the genus Synergus.

The plant galls mostly develop directly after the female insect lays the eggs. The inducement for the gall formation is largely unknown; discussion speculates as to chemical, mechanical, and viral triggers. The hatching larvae nourish themselves with the nutritive tissue of the galls, in which they are otherwise well-protected from external environmental effects. The host plants, and the size and shape of the galls are specific to the majority of gall wasps, with about 70% of the known species parasitizing various types of oak trees. Galls can be found on nearly all parts of such trees, including the leaves, buds, branches, and roots. Other species of gall wasps live in eucalyptus trees, rose bushes or maple trees, as well as many herbs. Species determination is usually much easier through observation of the galls produced rather than of the insect itself.

Parasitism 
A gall protects the developing gall wasp  for the most vulnerable stage of its life cycle, but many other wasps have found a way to penetrate this defence and parasitise the larva(e) within. Some of these parasitoids use their long, hardened egg-laying tube (ovipositor) to bore into the gall and lay an egg on the helpless gall maker. A bedeguar or robin's pincushions gall, collected before the autumn and kept cool, may result in at least one species of parasitoid emerging instead of the gall maker. These wasps, such as Eurytoma rosae, are beautiful, metallic insects with long ovipositors. These parasitoids may, in turn, be preyed upon by other wasps, hyperparasitoids.

Types 
Most species of gall wasps live as gall-formers on oaks. One of the most well-known is the common oak gall wasp (Cynips quercusfolii), which induces characteristic, 2-cm in diameter, spherical galls on the undersides of oak leaves.

These turn reddish in the fall and are commonly known as oak apples. Light lentiform galls on the undersides of the same leaves are induced by Neuroterus quercusbaccarum; darker ones with bulging edges are formed by Neuroterus numismalis. Also striking are the galls of Cynips longiventris, which likewise can be found on the undersides of leaves, and are recognizable for their spheroidal shape and irregular red streaks. The oak potato gall wasp (Biorrhiza pallida) has round galls that grow to about 4 cm. These are known colloquially as oak potatoes. The latter type of gall is induced by this type of wasp not on the leaves, but on the roots of the oak. On the buds of young oak twigs, one can often find the hard-shelled galls of Andricus kollari and Andricus quercustozae.  Galls do not cause significant harm to oak trees.

The galls of the rose gall wasp (Diplolepis rosae) are also distinctive and are known as bedeguars or robin's pincushions. These are found on the shoots of dog roses and have a length of up to 5 cm with red, long-haired outgrowths. Inside the galls are several chambers, which may be occupied by larvae.

Subfamilies
There are two subfamilies, one extinct and one extant:
 Cynipinae
 Hodiernocynipinae†

Tribes 
There are twelve tribes:
 Aulacideini Nieves-Aldrey, Nylander & Ronquist, 2015.
 Aylacini Ashmead, 1903.
 Ceroptresini Nieves-Aldrey, Nylander & Ronquist, 2015.
 Cynipini Billberg, 1820.
 Diastrophini Nieves-Aldrey, Nylander & Ronquist, 2015.
 Diplolepidini Latreille, 1802.
 Eschatocerini Ashmead, 1903.
 Paraulacini Nieves-Aldrey & Liljeblad, 2009.
 Pediaspini Ashmead, 1903.
 Phanacidini Nieves-Aldrey, Nylander & Ronquist, 2015.
 Qwaqwaiini Liljeblad, Nieves-Aldrey & Melika, 2011.
 Synergini Ashmead, 1896.

Genera
 List of Cynipidae genera

Additional information 
 The galls of several species, especially Mediterranean variants, were once used as tanning agents.
 Before his work in human sexuality, Alfred Kinsey was known for his study of gall wasps.
 Galls formed on oak trees are one of the main ingredients in iron gall ink.

See also 
 Oak apple
 Oak marble gall
 Knopper gall
 Rose bedeguar gall
 Common spangle gall
 Silk button gall

References 

 This article is based on a translation of the corresponding article from the German Wikipedia.

Further reading

External links 
 
 Andricus quercusclavigera and A. quercuscornigera on the UF / IFAS Featured Creatures Web site
 Wikispecies entry
 Family Cynipidae at BugGuide

 
Gall-inducing insects
Asexual reproduction in animals